Championship Rally may refer to:

Gaming
 Championship Rally, a racing video game made for the Nintendo Entertainment System
 Rally Championship (series), a series of video games released from 1988 to 2002
 World Rally Championship (video game series), a series of five video games for the Sony PlayStation

Motorsport
 World Rally Championship, the FIA rally series 1973–present